Augusta County is a county in the Shenandoah Valley on the western edge of the Commonwealth of Virginia. The second-largest county of Virginia by total area, it completely surrounds the independent cities of Staunton and Waynesboro. Its county seat is Staunton, but most of the administrative services have offices in neighboring Verona.

The county was created in 1738 from part of Orange County and was named after Princess Augusta of Saxe-Gotha. It was originally a huge area, but many of its parts were carved out to form other counties and several states until the current borders were finalized in 1790.

As of the 2020 census, the county's population was 77,487. Along with Staunton and Waynesboro, it forms the Staunton–Waynesboro, VA Metropolitan Statistical Area.

History 

Augusta County was formed in 1738 from Orange County, although, because few people lived there, the county government was not organized until 1745. It was named for Augusta of Saxe-Gotha, Princess of Wales and mother of the future King George III of the United Kingdom.

Originally, Augusta County was a vast territory with an indefinite western boundary. Most of what is now West Virginia as well as the whole of Kentucky were within its early bounds. Additionally, the territory north and west of those areas, theoretically all the way to the Pacific Ocean, were as well.

Reductions in its extent began in 1770, when its southern part became Botetourt County. In 1776 part of western Augusta County, an area also known as the District of West Augusta, became Monongalia County, Ohio County, and Yohogania County (abolished in 1786). In 1778 the portion of Augusta County north and west of the Ohio River became Illinois County (abolished in 1784); the northeastern part of what was remained became Rockingham County, and the southwestern part was combined with part of Botetourt County to form Rockbridge County.  In 1788 the northern part of the county was combined with part of Hardy County to become Pendleton County. Augusta County assumed its present dimensions in 1790, when its western part was combined with parts of Botetourt County and Greenbrier County to form Bath County.

During the Civil War, Augusta County served as an important agricultural center as part of the "Breadbasket of the Confederacy." The Virginia Central Railroad ran through the county, linking the Shenandoah Valley to the Confederate capital at Richmond. One of the bloodiest engagements fought in the Shenandoah Valley took place on June 5, 1864, at the Battle of Piedmont, a Union victory that allowed the Union Army to occupy Staunton and destroy many of the facilities that supported the Confederate war effort. Augusta County suffered again during General Philip H. Sheridan's "Burning," which destroyed many farms and killed virtually all of the farm animals.

Staunton, the county seat for many years, was incorporated as a city in 1871 and separated from Augusta County in 1902. However, it remained the county seat.

Geography

It is the third-largest county in Virginia by land area and second-largest by total area.

Adjacent counties and independent cities
 Staunton (Enclaved)
 Waynesboro (Enclaved)
 Pendleton County, West Virginia (North)
 Rockingham County (Northeast)
 Albemarle County (East)
 Nelson County (Southeast)
 Rockbridge County (Southwest)
 Bath County (West)
 Highland County (Northwest)

Districts 
The county is divided into seven magisterial districts: Beverley Manor, Middle River, North River, Pastures, Riverheads, South River, and Wayne.

School systems 
The county is serviced by Augusta County Public Schools.

National protected areas
 Blue Ridge Parkway (part)
 George Washington National Forest (part)
 Shenandoah National Park (part)

Regional park
 Natural Chimneys

Major highways

Demographics

2020 census

Note: the US Census treats Hispanic/Latino as an ethnic category. This table excludes Latinos from the racial categories and assigns them to a separate category. Hispanics/Latinos can be of any race.

2000 Census
As of the Census of 2000, there were 65,615 people, 24,818 households, and 18,911 families residing in the county.  The population density was 68 people per square mile (26/km2).  There were 26,738 housing units at an average density of 28 per square mile (11/km2).  The racial makeup of the county was 95.02% White, 3.60% Black or African American, 0.15% Native American, 0.28% Asian, 0.02% Pacific Islander, 0.32% from other races, and 0.61% from two or more races. 0.94% of the population were Hispanic or Latino of any race.

There were 24,818 households, of which 33.00% had children under the age of 18 living with them, 63.70% were married couples living together, 8.60% had a female householder with no husband present, and 23.80% were non-families. 20.10% of all households were made up of individuals, and 8.10% had someone living alone who was 65 years of age or older.  The average household size was 2.56 and the average family size was 2.94.

In the county, the population was spread out, with 23.70% under the age of 18, 6.90% from 18 to 24, 29.80% from 25 to 44, 26.80% from 45 to 64, and 12.80% who were 65 years of age or older.  The median age was 39 years. For every 100 females there were 101.10 males.  For every 100 females age 18 and over, there were 99.80 males.

The median income for a household in the county was $43,045, and the median income for a family was $48,579. Males had a median income of $31,577 versus $24,233 for females. The per capita income for the county was $19,744.  About 4.20% of families and 5.80% of the population were below the poverty line, including 6.40% of those under age 18 and 6.60% of those age 65 or over.

Area Populations

According to the 2010 US Census data, below are the populations of the two towns and select unincorporated communities within Augusta County:

The majority of Grottoes is located in Rockingham County.  Only seven of the town's 2,668 residents reside in Augusta County.

Government

Board of Supervisors
 Beverley Manor district: Butch Wells (R)
 Middle River district: Gerald W. Garber (R)
 North River district: Jeffrey “Jeff” Slaven (R)
 Pastures district: Pam L. Carter (R)
 Riverheads district: Michael L. Shull (R)
 South River district: Steven “Steve” Morelli (R)
 Wayne district: Scott Seaton (R)

Constitutional Officers
 Clerk of the Circuit Court: Steve Landes (R)
 Commissioner of the Revenue: W. Jean Shrewsbury (R)
 Commonwealth's Attorney: Tim Martin (R)
 Sheriff: Donald L. Smith (I) 
 Treasurer: Richard T. Homes (R)

State and Federal
Augusta County is represented by Republican Emmett W. Hanger in the Virginia Senate, Republican John Avoili, Republican Ronnie R. Campbell, and Republican Chris Runion in the Virginia House of Delegates, and Republican Ben Cline in the U.S. House of Representatives.

Law enforcement
The Augusta County Sheriff's Office is the primary law enforcement agency in Augusta County. The ACSO was created in 1745 when James Patton was elected as the first sheriff. The ACSO was accredited by the Virginia Law Enforcement Accreditation Coalition. The agency is currently headed by Sheriff Donald Smith. The ACSO currently has 72 sworn deputies and 6 dispatchers.

In 2021, the sheriff's department arrested eight individuals for protesting outside the Sheriff's Office. In response to the shooting of two men by deputies earlier that year, the protestors wanted deputies to use body cameras. Most of the charges were thrown out by a judge in 2022. Body cameras were not included in the 2022 budget: initially the county board of supervisors instead created a fund for body cameras that the community could donate to, but they shortly rescinded that decision over a desire to avoid contributions to the fund by the protesting group.

Economy
According to the county's 2011 Comprehensive Annual Financial Report, the top employers in the county are:

Communities
The independent cities of Staunton and Waynesboro (incorporated as such in 1902 and 1948 respectively) are located within the boundaries of Augusta County, but are not a part of the county, despite Staunton's status as the county seat.  Most county administrative offices, however, are located in Verona, rather than in Staunton.

Towns
 Craigsville
 Grottoes (partial)

Census-designated places

 Augusta Springs
 Churchville
 Crimora
 Deerfield
 Dooms
 Greenville
 Harriston
 Fishersville
 Jolivue
 Lyndhurst
 Middlebrook
 Mount Sidney
 New Hope
 Sherando
 Stuarts Draft
 Verona
 Weyers Cave
 Wintergreen (mostly in Nelson County)

Other unincorporated communities

 Fort Defiance
 Love
 Mint Spring
 Mount Solon
 Spring Hill
 Steeles Tavern
 Swoope
 West Augusta

Notable people

 Thomas Adams, born in Augusta County, member of the Virginia House of Burgesses and signer of the Articles of Confederation
 Robert Allen, born in Augusta County, United States Congressman from Tennessee
 George Caleb Bingham (1811–1879), born in Augusta County, noted painter and State Treasurer of Missouri
 Gideon Blackburn (1772–1838), born in Augusta County, noted clergyman and founder of Blackburn College
 John Brown, lawyer and statesman
 Samuel Brown, born in Augusta County, noted surgeon and editor
 John Wilson Campbell, born in Augusta County, United States Congressman from Ohio 
 William Campbell, born in Augusta County, militia leader in the American Revolutionary War
 John Colter (c.1774–May 7, 1812(?)), born near Stuarts Draft, was a member of the Lewis and Clark Expedition (1804–1806); best remembered for his 1807–1808 explorations as the first person of European descent to enter the region now known as Yellowstone National Park and the Grand Tetons
 Samuel Doak, (1749–1830), born in Augusta County, noted Presbyterian clergyman, founder of Washington College, the first college west of the Alleghenies, noted abolitionist
 Ida Stover Eisenhower (1862–1946), mother of President Dwight D. Eisenhower, was born in Mount Sidney, Augusta County
 John H. Fulton, (died 1836), born in Augusta County, United States Congressman from Virginia
 John P. Gaines, (1795–1857), born in Augusta County, United States Congressman from Kentucky and governor of the Oregon Territory.
 John D. Imboden, (1823–1895), born in Augusta County, member of the Virginia General Assembly, Confederate Army cavalry general and partisan fighter in the American Civil War.
 "Irish" John Lewis (1678–1762), opened up what is now Augusta County to settlement.
 Thomas Lewis, Jr., born in Augusta County, United States Congressman from Virginia.
 William J. Lewis, (1766–1828), born in Augusta County, United States Congressman from Virginia.
 Robert D. Lilley, (1836–1886), born in Greenville, Augusta County, Confederate Army general in the American Civil War.
 Benjamin Logan, (c.1742–1803), born in Augusta County, United States Congressman from Kentucky.
 George Mathews, (1739–1812), born in Augusta County, United States Congressman and Governor of Georgia. Member of the Mathews family.
 Sampson Mathews, (c. 1737–1806), born in Augusta County, Virginia State Senator and Revolutionary War officer. Member of the Mathews family.
 Robert McKnight (c.1789–1846), born in Augusta County, moved to St. Louis, Missouri, in 1809, member of a trading expedition under Zebulon Pike to Santa Fe, New Mexico, in 1812, captured by Spanish and imprisoned until 1821, eventually renounced his United States citizenship, moved to Mexico, and became owner of the Santa Rita del Cobre copper mine in  Chihuahua (now New Mexico).
 Thomas McKnight, businessman and member of Wisconsin Territorial Council
 James Patton (1692-1755), Irish immigrant who served as Justice of the Peace, Colonel of Militia and Chief Commander of the Augusta County Militia, County Lieutenant, President of the Augusta Court, county coroner, county escheator, and County Sheriff. 
 Joel F. Salatin (b. 1957), founder, owner and manager of Polyface Farm in Swoope, Virginia.

 Thomas Woodrow Wilson (Dec. 28, 1856–Feb. 3, 1924) 28th President of the United States of America, 34th Governor of New Jersey, and 13th President of Princeton University located in Princeton, New Jersey.

See also 
 Augusta County Sheriff's Office
 National Register of Historic Places listings in Augusta County, Virginia

References

Further reading
 Peyton's History of Augusta County, Virginia (1882), searchable online edition of the 1882 edition by J. Lewis Peyton.
 Waddell's Annals of Augusta County, Virginia, from 1726 to 1871, searchable online edition of the 1902 second edition by Jos. A. Waddell.
 Augusta County Resources, a Rootsweb page of historical and genealogical links and references, including maps.

External links

 
 Augusta County official website
 Augusta County Economic Development Agency
 Augusta County Facts and Genealogy Resources

 
Virginia counties
1738 establishments in the Thirteen Colonies
Populated places established in 1738